National Advanced Youth Leadership Experience (NAYLE) is a training program of  Boy Scouts of America. The format is a week-long, leadership development experience, providing young men and women aged 14 through 20 the environment to enhance their leadership skills.

Program content

Initially developed for Philmont Training Center (PTC) at Rayado Ridge Leadership Camp in Cimarron, New Mexico, the program has been offered regionally and at other high adventure bases. NAYLE is an element of the Youth Leadership Training Continuum.

NAYLE expands upon the team-building and ethical decision-making skills learned in National Youth Leadership Training (NYLT) , which is a pre-requisite for NAYLE. NAYLE uses the Philmont Ranger training and advanced search-and-rescue training to teach leadership, teamwork, and the lessons of selfless service. NAYLE is included in the overall leadership training program.

NAYLE replaces the National Youth Leader Instructor Camp (NYLIC), which itself replaced the previous National Junior Leader Instructor Camp (NJLIC). Unlike NYLIC, NAYLE is not intended to specifically train youth staff for local NYLT courses.

As of 2018, challenging program is based at two of the four Boy Scout High Adventure bases:
 Philmont Scout Ranch (Rayado Ridge Leadership Camp, part of Philmont Training Center) 
 Summit Bechtel Reserve (SBR)
In prior years (2011 to 2013), NAYLE was conducted regionally at Boy Scout camps including Onteora Scout Reservation in Livingston Manor, NY, but these courses have since been discontinued.

Program goals

The program promises a number of subjective outcomes focusing on an individual's perspective, opinion, and feelings, including "growing self-awareness, growing self-confidence, growing creativity, the happiness from helping others succeed, understanding that everyone is a leader, everyone in the group contributes in a significant way to team success, knowing leadership is a way of life."

The program's goals are to:

 Encourage others to a life of leadership service
 Act as a servant leader who shares the skills of NYLT and helps develop other leaders through their enhanced understanding of the material
 Intuitively use the leadership skills in all aspects of their lives
 Be an advocate for Introduction to Leadership Skills for Troops (ILST), Introduction to Leadership Skills for Crews (ILSC) and NYLT in their local environment
 Use positive reinforcement to help others do their best

NAYLE is designed to equip participants with the skills to return to their local council and serve as staff on their local NYLT course, as summer camp staff, and as better troop leaders. NAYLE is designed to teach participants servant leadership skills in Scouting and for later life so they can lead for the good of others.

Program activities

During the week-long backcountry experience, participants are challenged with various activities linked to the skills of leadership defined in NYLT:

Requirements

Attendees must meet these qualifications:

 Be a graduate of their home unit's leadership training program< (either Introduction to Leadership Skills for Troops or its Venturing equivalent, Introduction to Leadership Skills for Crews, and have completed National Youth Leadership Training (NYLT).
 Be in good physical condition (Parts A, B, C, and D of the BSA Annual Health and Medical Record is required).
 Be at least 14 years of age by the first day of the program (and less than 20 years old).
 Currently hold a leadership position in their home unit.

In 2010, program attendance was opened to females.  The NYLT to NAYLE Bridge Course was available during the first quarter of 2010 for Venturing youth who were not previously able to take NYLT. Venturing Crew members must now take NYLT to attend NAYLE.

The cost of the program varies by venue. Travel to each location is the responsibility of the participant.

References

Leadership training of the Boy Scouts of America
Youth in the United States
2006 establishments in the United States